Cristian Rodríguez (born 24 June 1990) is a Colombian tennis player who plays primarily on the ATP Challenger Tour and ITF Futures Tour. On 9 April 2018, he reached his career-high ATP singles ranking of world No. 362. He reached a career-high doubles ranking of world No. 71 on 15 August 2022. He has played for the Colombia Davis Cup team since 2018 with an overall record of 1–0, with the sole match coming in singles play.

Rodriguez has won three singles titles, all coming at the ITF Futures tour level, and he has won 25 doubles titles, with nine achieved at the ATP Challenger Tour level and 16 ITF.

Doubles performance timeline

''Current till 2022 Wimbledon Championships – Men's doubles.

ATP Challenger and ITF Futures finals

Singles: 12 (3–9)

Doubles: 53 (25–28)

External links
 
 
 

1990 births
Living people
Colombian male tennis players
South American Games bronze medalists for Colombia
South American Games medalists in tennis
Competitors at the 2018 South American Games
Sportspeople from Bogotá
21st-century Colombian people